Ericeia plaesiodes is a moth in the family Erebidae. It is found in Australia, where it has been recorded from Queensland, the Northern Territory and New South Wales.

The wings are greyish brown with a complex pattern.

References

Moths described in 1932
Ericeia